The 2012–13 Maryland Eastern Shore Hawks men's basketball team represented the University of Maryland Eastern Shore during the 2012–13 NCAA Division I men's basketball season. The Hawks, led by fifth year head coach Frankie Allen, played their home games at the Hytche Athletic Center and were members of the Mid-Eastern Athletic Conference. They finished the season 2–26, 2–14 in MEAC play to finish in a tie for twelfth place. They lost in the first round of the MEAC tournament to Savannah State.

Roster

Schedule

|-
!colspan=9| Exhibition

|-
!colspan=9| Regular season

|-
!colspan=9| 2013 MEAC men's basketball tournament

References

Maryland Eastern Shore Hawks men's basketball seasons
Maryland-Eastern Shore